Eduard Anatoliyovych Stavytsky (born 4 October 1972) is a Ukrainian politician and government official who held several ministerial portfolios in the Azarov Government (2012–2014).

As part of investigation about facts of state property theft by government officials from the Ministry of Power and Coal Industry, in apartments and offices that belong to Stavytsky were searched by authorities who discovered 42 kg of gold, $4.8 million, and collection of expensive watches.

In 2014 Stavytsky was given political asylum in Israel under name Nathan Rosenberg.

Brief biographical overview
A graduate of the National Mining University of Ukraine (Dnipropetrovsk) and the National Academy of State Management (Kyiv), in 1994–2006 Stavytsky worked on management positions at the "Ecological Fuel of Ukraine" in Oleksandriya, while also sponsoring the local youth football club "Oleksandriya-Amethyst" (part of the FC Oleksandriya).

Inn 2007–2010 Stavytsky worked as a director of the state company "Nadra Ukrayiny" that specializes in geological surveying and governed by the State Service of Geology and Subsoil of Ukraine (Ministry of Ecology and Natural Resources). During that period he was suspected in unlawful alienation of the state residence, for which he was fired twice, but reinstated on court orders.

In 2010 after Mykola Azarov became the Prime Minister of Ukraine, Stavytsky was reinstated and later promoted to a chairman of State Service of Geology and Subsoil of Ukraine. The same year he also was able to become a local representative in the Zhytomyr Oblast Council. In April–December 2012 Stavytsky was given a portfolio of the Minister of Ecology and Natural Resources of Ukraine in the First Azarov Cabinet. After Azarov was reelected as the Prime Minister, Stavytsky became the Minister of Power Generation and Coal Industry of Ukraine.

As part of investigation against the Ukrainian holding company VETEK owned by Serhiy Kurchenko, Eduard Stavytsky got on the wanted list of the General Prosecutor of Ukraine. He is since then a fugitive. According to the Prosecutor office Stavytsky is, as an Israeli citizen, hiding in Israel under the assumed name of Nathan Rosenberg.

On 15 April 2014 Stavytsky's assets in the European Union were frozen.

Nadra Ukrayiny and Mezhyhirya
Between June through November 2007 the state residence switched ownership at least four times, while also being involved into a court case during that period.

See also
 MedInvestTrade
 Mezhyhirya Residence

References

External links
 Stavytsky at the Official Ukraine today website
 Stavytsky at the Zhytomyr regional council website
 Chyvokunia, V. ''Yushchenko and Yanukovych were accomplices during the alienation of Mezhyhirya. Ukrayinska Pravda. 20 February 2008

1972 births
21st-century Ukrainian politicians
Living people
People from Lebedyn
Dnipro Polytechnic alumni
National Academy of State Administration alumni
Ecology and natural resources ministers of Ukraine
Energy and coal industry ministers of Ukraine
Party of Regions politicians
Fugitives wanted by Ukraine
Russian individuals subject to European Union sanctions